Edmund Walter Fitton-Brown (born 5 October 1962) is a British diplomat who is currently a Monitoring Team Coordinator with the United Nations. From February 2015 to February 2017, he served as Ambassador of the United Kingdom to Yemen.

Fitton-Brown read history at Corpus Christi College, Cambridge; after graduating, he joined Her Majesty's Diplomatic Service in 1984. Between 1991 and 2003, he served as First Secretary before becoming Counsellor in Cairo, Rome and others. Since 2018, he has acted as an expert supporting UN Security Council Committees responsible for sanctions against Al Qaeda, ISIL/Daesh and the Taliban.

References

1962 births
Living people
Members of HM Diplomatic Service
Ambassadors of the United Kingdom to Yemen
Alumni of Corpus Christi College, Cambridge
20th-century British diplomats